Simopone is a genus of predominantly arboreal ants in the subfamily Dorylinae. The genus is widely distributed in the Old World tropics, with the majority of species in Madagascar and sub-Saharan Africa.

Taxonomy
The genus was first described by Forel (1891), based on a Simopone grandidier specimen. Brown (1975) revised the genus and recognized 13 species altogether. The number of species was raised to 15 by Kutter (1976, 1977) and to 38 by Bolton & Fisher (2012). Bolton & Fisher considered one of the African species described by Brown (1975), S. conciliatrix, so different from all the others in the genus that it is transferred to its own monotypic genus, Vicinopone.

Description
Simopone species are almost entirely arboreal, but on occasion foraging workers are found on the ground or in rotten logs. Prey records are extremely sparse for this genus, consisting only of Crematogaster brood by S. vepres, and the brood of Terataner by S. sicaria. Nevertheless, these two records support the general supposition by Brown (1975) that most or all members of tribe Cerapachyini prey on other ants, or more probably the brood of other ants, but actual records are extremely rare.

Known queens are entirely worker-like except that the mesosoma has a full complement of flight sclerites. No queen recognizable by external morphology has been seen in any Malagasy species, the queens of which are suspected to be remarkably ergatoid, or perhaps even replaced by gamergates. Workers of most (perhaps all) species exhibit considerable size variation.

Species

 Simopone amana Bolton & Fisher, 2012
 Simopone annettae Kutter, 1976
 Simopone bakeri Menozzi, 1926
 Simopone brunnea Bolton & Fisher, 2012
 Simopone chapmani Taylor, 1966
 Simopone conradti Emery, 1899
 Simopone consimilis Bolton & Fisher, 2012
 Simopone dignita Bolton & Fisher, 2012
 Simopone dryas Bolton & Fisher, 2012
 Simopone dux Bolton & Fisher, 2012
 Simopone elegans Bolton & Fisher, 2012
 Simopone emeryi Forel, 1892 
 Simopone fera Bolton & Fisher, 2012
 Simopone fulvinodis Santschi, 1923
 Simopone grandidieri Forel, 1891 
 Simopone grandis  Santschi, 1923 
 Simopone gressitti  Taylor, 1965
 Simopone inculta Bolton & Fisher, 2012
 Simopone laevissima  Arnold, 1954
 Simopone latiscapa Bolton & Fisher, 2012
 Simopone marleyi  Arnold, 1915
 Simopone matthiasi  Kutter, 1977
 Simopone mayri Emery, 1911
 Simopone merita Bolton & Fisher, 2012
 Simopone miniflava Bolton & Fisher, 2012
 Simopone nonnihil Bolton & Fisher, 2012
 Simopone occulta Bolton & Fisher, 2012
 Simopone oculata  Radchenko, 1993
 Simopone persculpta Bolton & Fisher, 2012
 Simopone rabula Bolton & Fisher, 2012
 Simopone rex Bolton & Fisher, 2012
 Simopone schoutedeni  Santschi, 1923
 Simopone sicaria Bolton & Fisher, 2012
 Simopone silens Bolton & Fisher, 2012
 Simopone trita Bolton & Fisher, 2012
 Simopone vepres Bolton & Fisher, 2012
 Simopone victrix Bolton & Fisher, 2012
 Simopone wilburi Weber, 1949

References

Brown, W.L., Jr. (1975) Contributions toward a reclassification of the Formicidae. 5. Ponerinae, tribes Platythyreini, Cerapachyini, Cylindromyrmecini, Acanthostichini, and Aenictogitini. Search Agriculture 5, Entomology (Ithaca) 15, 1–115.

Kutter, H. (1976) Beitrag zur Kenntnis der Gattung Simopone Forel. Mitteilungen der Schweizerischen Entomologischen Gesellschaft, 49, 273–276.
Kutter, H. (1977) Zweiter Beitrag zur Kenntnis der Gattung Simopone Forel. Mitteilungen der Schweizerischen Entomologischen Gesellschaft, 50, 173–176.

External links

Dorylinae
Ant genera
Hymenoptera of Africa